Patrick Ogunsoto (born 19 April 1983) is a Nigerian former professional footballer who played as a striker. He spent the majority of his career in Greece and is best known for his tenure at Greek side Ergotelis, for which he still remains the all-time top scorer.

Career

Early career
Ogunsoto started his career with local clubs in Lagos, eventually signing with local side Julius Berger at 17. He then made his first European move by signing with Paniliakos in Greece, but wouldn't be eligible to play for the club. He returned to Nigeria and Julius Berger for one year. At age 19, he was tried out by Greek clubs Aris Thessaloniki and Ergotelis but eventually signed with Cypriot First Division club APOEL. As he was deemed too young to be included among his manager's Eugene Gerards' plans, he returned to Greece in 2002 and signed for Cretan club Ergotelis, which played in the Greek Gamma Ethniki at the time.

Ergotelis
Ogunsoto built up his reputation in Greece during his spell at Ergotelis, in which he scored a total of 71 goals in 114 appearances, celebrating consecutive promotions in a steady run from the Gamma Ethniki to Greece's top tier football division, the Superleague. In his first season at Ergotelis, Ogunsoto scored 30 goals in 32 games and the team was promoted to the Beta Ethniki. He followed up with another 9 goals in his second season, helping the club gain another promotion, this time in the Alpha Ethniki, Greece's top tier football division. He continued being the club's top scorer for a third year in a row, scoring 11 goals in 29 games during the club's first season in the Alpha Ethniki, but the team was eventually relegated. Then Ogunsoto became instrumental in the club's second promotion and winning of the division title, by being declared top-scorer once again with a total of 21 goals at the end of the 2005−06 season. His performances did not go unnoticed though, and after brief flirts with Greek giants Panathinaikos and AEK, he subsequently moved to Belgium and K.V.C. Westerlo, thus ending a remarkable 4-year run with Ergotelis in Crete.

Westerlo
In his first season with Westerlo, Ogunsoto became second top scorer in the Jupiler Pro League, scoring 20 goals in 34 games. Despite reported interest from Dutch Eredivisie and Russian Premier League clubs, Ogunsoto remained for a second season with Westerlo, making 10 appearances and scoring no goals. In January 2008, he would return to his former club Ergotelis, expressing a desire to return to the club where he made his name.

Return to Ergotelis
On January 18, 2008, Ogunsoto returned to Ergotelis signing a 3-year contract. He scored 6 goals in 13 matches, helping the club avoid relegation at the end of the season. He made another 29 appearances in the 2008-09 season, scoring 8 goals. However, tensions rose between the player and manager Nikos Karageorgiou, which led to an eventual fallout with the club's board of directors. Next season saw Ogunsoto making a total of 6 appearances for the club, mostly as a substitute. On the winter transfer window of 2009, Ogunsoto was loaned to local rival OFI, playing in the Beta Ethniki on a six-month deal. He featured in 22 matches total, scoring 6 goals for the club. Finally, on August 2010, the 27-year-old Nigerian striker, terminated his contract with Ergotelis on mutual consent. For his achievements with Ergotelis since his original tenure, he was honoured by club president Apostolos Papoutsakis with a golden emblem of the club. In a total of 162 official matches, he had scored 85 goals, making him the club's all-time top scorer.

Later pro career
On January 18, 2011, Ogunsoto signed a 1.5-year contract with Lokomotiv Plovdiv as a free agent. He was released from the team at the end of the 2011/2012 A PFG season, making a total of 3 appearances and having scored 1 goal. In the summer of 2012 he returned to Greece and moved to Anagennisi Epanomi in the Football League. Ogunsoto finished the first half of the season with 5 goals in 11 appearances. In winter transfer window he moved to Olympiakos Volou, and ironically scored his first goal against his former team Ergotelis in a 2-0 home win. He finished the season with 7 goals in 23 appearances for the club. On 16 July 2013, Ogunsoto signed a one-year contract with Acharnaikos in the Gamma Ethniki. After six months, 11 appearances and three goals, he was released from his contract. After a couple of weeks Ogunsoto agreed to continue his career at Ermionida in the Football League 2 (Greece). Three months later however, he would terminate his contract with the club after realizing he was not counted among the first choices of Ermionida manager Roberto Bolano.

Amateur divisions
In the summer of 2015, Ogunsoto underwent trial with Belgian Second Division club KMSK Deinze, without however signing a contract with the club. In January 2016, Ogunsoto returned to Greece and reportedly partook in training sessions of Thessaloniki-based amateur club Keravnos Aggelochori, a club playing in regional Macedonia FCA competitions. He eventually signed a contract with fellow Thessaloniki-based club Doxa Trilofos in February 2016. In July 2016, Ogunsoto signed with Macedonia FCA A1 Championship Division club Makedonikos. Ogunsoto helped the club achieve promotion to the Gamma Ethniki as champions, contributing with 8 goals in 19 games. He was offered the position of general manager at Makedonikos at the end of the season but declined, as he was keen on playing football for at least one more season.

Aged 34, Ogunsoto applied, and was rumored to participate in the sixth season of Greece's highly popular reality show Survivor, entering negotiations with several clubs playing in local football championships of Greece. He eventually signed a contract with Thrace FCA club Megas Alexandros Iasmos. He left the club in January 2018  citing personal reasons, having scored 8 goals in 11 matches. He then signed with another amateur club from Chalkidiki, Moudania until the end of the season.

Career statistics

Personal
Considered as one of the most charismatic strikers to ever grace Greek football competitions, Ogunsoto rose to cult status in Greece during his tenure at Ergotelis for his non-proficient use of the Greek language at the time, exhibited during an enraged post-match interview after a 1−1 Cretan derby draw vs. OFI in 2008. Lashing out against the referee for poor officiating, Ogunsoto delivered his infamous «Pos genen afto» speech (roughly translated as «How can this happen»), which has since spawned many memes and is frequently used as a catchphrase across Greece and Greek media.

Ogunsoto had applied for the sixth season of the popular reality show Survivor Greece, and was eventually admitted into the show halfway during the seventh season.

Honours

Club
Ergotelis
 2nd division: 2005−06

Individual
3rd division Top goalscorer: 2002−03
2nd division Top goalscorer: 2005−06
Greek Cup Top goalscorer: 2002–03

Records
 Ergotelis All-time Top goalscorer: 85 goals.

References

External links
 

1983 births
Living people
Yoruba sportspeople
Sportspeople from Lagos
Nigerian footballers
Nigerian expatriate footballers
Super League Greece players
Football League (Greece) players
Belgian Pro League players
First Professional Football League (Bulgaria) players
Expatriate footballers in Greece
Expatriate footballers in Cyprus
Expatriate footballers in Belgium
Expatriate footballers in Bulgaria
Nigerian expatriate sportspeople in Greece
Nigerian expatriate sportspeople in Cyprus
Nigerian expatriate sportspeople in Belgium
Nigerian expatriate sportspeople in Bulgaria
Paniliakos F.C. players
Warri Wolves F.C. players
APOEL FC players
Ergotelis F.C. players
K.V.C. Westerlo players
Makedonikos F.C. players
OFI Crete F.C. players
PFC Lokomotiv Plovdiv players
Olympiacos Volos F.C. players
Acharnaikos F.C. players
Association football forwards
Survivor Turkey contestants
Survivor Greece contestants